William Stemmyer (May 6, 1865 – May 3, 1945) was a Major League Baseball pitcher for the Boston Beaneaters and Cleveland Blues. He was nicknamed "Cannonball".

In 1886 – his first and only full season in the majors – Stemmyer led the National League in strikeouts per 9 innings (6.17) and wild pitches (63). The 63 wild pitches is still the highest single-season total in National League history.

Stemmyer died in his hometown three days before his 80th birthday.

See also
List of Major League Baseball annual saves leaders

References

External links

1865 births
1945 deaths
19th-century baseball players
Major League Baseball pitchers
Baseball players from Cleveland
Boston Beaneaters players
Cleveland Blues (1887–88) players
New Castle Neshannocks players
Toronto (minor league baseball) players
Toledo Avengers players